The African Company Act 1750 was an Act passed by the Parliament of Great Britain which dissolved the Royal African Company and created the African Company of Merchants, to whom the assets of the former were passed.

The Royal African Company had been in financial difficulties for many years, but by 1747 these difficulties grew more acute. They also informed parliament in February of that year that it was incapable of defending its forts and castles against possible attack by the French.

References

External links
 An act for extending and improving the trade to Africa, full text

Great Britain Acts of Parliament 1750
Slave trade legislation
African Company of Merchants